Greatest Hits (titled Greatest Hits Vol. II in Australia) is a compilation of hits by the Australian band Little River Band, released in November 1982. The album peaked at No. 13 on the Australian Kent Music Report albums chart, at No. 1 in New Zealand, and at No. 33 on the Billboard 200. It included two new tracks, "The Other Guy" and "Down on The Border", to introduce the band's new lead singer, John Farnham. In 1992, it was certified 2× Platinum by the RIAA.

The album was digitally remastered and repackaged with additional tracks in an expanded edition in 2000.

Reception
Cash Box magazine said "This is a unique 'best of' package in that it serves to close the door of one era of this most popular Australian band's career while ushering in another. Glenn Shorrock, the 'voice' of LRB for so many years, has departed for a solo flight, while the 'new' lineup with lead singer John Farnham is represented here by the currently rising Top 40 tune 'The Other Guy' and 'Down On the Border'. Fans of LRB can reminisce over 'Reminiscing', 'Lady', 'Help Is On The Way' [sic], 'Lonesome Loser', 'Happy Anniversary', 'Night Owls' and the more recent hits, 'Man On Your Mind' and 'Take It Easy On Me'."

Track listing

Versions 

Initial copies of the digitally remastered 2000 edition contained never-before-heard alternative versions of three of its tracks:

"Take It Easy on Me"

When the band recorded the album Time Exposure in Montserrat with George Martin, two versions of this song were recorded, with Glenn Shorrock and Wayne Nelson respectively on lead vocal. "The Night Owls", with Nelson on lead vocal, had already been selected as the first single from the album. When Martin selected the Nelson version of "Take It Easy on Me" for the album and second single, Shorrock complained, and his version of the song was used instead. It is the Nelson version of "Take It Easy on Me" that appeared on the first 2000 release of Greatest Hits.

"Man on Your Mind"

The alternative version uses a horn section in the backing music.

"The Night Owls"

The alternative version has a heavier guitar sound.

Some members of the band objected to these alternative tracks. The remaining CDs were removed from the market and reissued with the original album tracks. The "unauthorised" version is keenly sought by collectors. However, the "unauthorised" version is still used on the Spotify streaming version of Greatest Hits.

Charts

Weekly charts

Year-end charts

Certifications

References

1982 greatest hits albums
Little River Band albums
Capitol Records compilation albums